Sinnonhyeon Station is a railway station on Line 9 and the Shinbundang Line of the Seoul Metropolitan Subway, located by the Kyobo Tower sageori in Nonhyeon-dong, Gangnam-gu, Seoul. It was the southern terminus of Line 9 from 2009 to March 2015, when the line was extended to Sports Complex station. Gangnam Station and Nonhyeon Station are near here. It became a transfer station to the Shinbundang Line on May 28, 2022.

The section of Gangnam Boulevard from exit No.5 of this station to exit No.2 of Gangnam Station of Line 2 is designated as a smoke-free zone by the Gangnam District office.

Station layout

References

Railway stations opened in 2009
Seoul Metropolitan Subway stations
Metro stations in Gangnam District